Eldorado High School is a public high school located in Eldorado, (USA). It is part of the Schleicher County Independent School District located in central Schleicher County and covers the entire county.  In 2015, the school was rated "Met Standard" by the Texas Education Agency.

Athletics
The Eldorado Eagles compete in these sports - 

Cross Country, Football, Basketball, Golf, Tennis, Track, Powerlifting, Softball & Baseball

State Titles
Boys Cross Country - 
1987(2A)
Boys Track - 
1964(1A)
Girls Track - 
1973(B)

Individual State Titles
Abigail Narvaez (Powerlifting) 
2016 (2A)

Band
Band Sweepstakes Champions 
2019(2A)

References

External links
Schleicher County ISD

Public high schools in Texas